was a town located in Minamisaku District, Nagano Prefecture, Japan.

On March 20, 2005, Saku, along with the village of Yachiho (also from Minamisaku District), was merged to create the town of Sakuho.

As of January 1, 2004, the town had an estimated population of 8,663. The total area was 122.11 km².

External links

 Town of Saku (Archive) 

Dissolved municipalities of Nagano Prefecture
Sakuho, Nagano